Robert Michell may refer to:

 Robert Michell (MP for Norwich) (died 1563), English politician
 Robert Michell (MP for Petersfield) (1653–1729), English politician
 Robert Michell (diplomat) (1876–1956), British minister to Bolivia and Uruguay and ambassador to Chile
 Robert Williams Michell (1863–1916), British surgeon

See also
 Robert Mitchell (disambiguation)
 Michell